
James Guthrie may refer to:

Church
James Guthrie (minister) (1612–1661), Scottish Presbyterian martyr, executed at the Restoration

Entertainment
James Guthrie (artist) (1859–1930), Scottish painter
James Guthrie (conductor) (1914–1996), American conductor and newspaper executive
James Guthrie (record producer) (born 1953), English recording engineer and record producer
Jim Guthrie (singer-songwriter), Canadian singer-songwriter

Politics
James Guthrie (Australian politician) (1872–1958), Australian Senator
James Guthrie (Kentucky politician) (1792–1869), railroad president, Secretary of the Treasury under President Franklin Pierce
Jim Guthrie (politician) (born 1955), Idaho State Representative

Sports
Jimmy Guthrie (footballer) (1912–1981), Scottish footballer
Jimmie Guthrie (1897–1937), motorcycle racer
Jim Guthrie (racing driver) (born 1961), race car driver

See also 
Guthrie (disambiguation)